Trouwe Kameraden  is a 1957 Dutch film directed by Henk van der Linden.

Cast
Martin Heijnekamp	... 	Jan
Thea Eyssen	... 	Tante
Buck Stevens	... 	Molenaar
Frits van Wenkop	... 	Crimineel
Giel Backbier	... 	Oom
Dirk Capel	... 	Crimineel
Frans Franssen	... 	Neefje Klaas
Nico Kwerreveld	... 	Kampeerder
Willem Marwa	... 	Kampeerder
Leo Mullers	... 	Kampeerder
Jos van der Linden	... 	Joske

External links 
 

1957 films
Dutch black-and-white films